Apteralcidion lapierrei is a species of beetle in the family Cerambycidae, the only species in the genus Apteralcidion.

References

Acanthocinini